Emre Topçu (born 21 August 2005) is a football player who plays as a midfielder for Drogheda United in the Eerste Divisie. Born in Ireland, he is a youth international for Turkiye.

Professional career
Topçu is a youth product of St. Kevin's Boys and Belvedere, before moving to Drogheda United's youth sides in 2020. He made his senior and professional debut with Drogheda United as a late substitute in a 2–0 League of Ireland loss to Sligo Rovers on 3 September 2022. On 15 September 2022, he signed a professional contract with Drogheda United for 2 years.

International career
Topçu was born in Ireland to a Turkish father and Irish mother. He is a youth international for Turkey, having been called up to the Turkey U18s in November 2022.

References

External links
 

2004 births
Living people
Association footballers from County Meath
Turkish footballers
Turkey youth international footballers
Republic of Ireland association footballers
Turkish people of Irish descent
Irish people of Turkish descent
Drogheda United F.C. players
League of Ireland players
Association football midfielders